The District Secretary, is a 1942 Soviet drama film directed by Ivan Pyryev.

Plot 
The film takes place in the first year of the Great Patriotic War. The plot is based on the fight between the commander of the partisan detachment and the Secretary of the District Committee of Kochet with Colonel Makenau.

Starring 
 Vasili Vanin as District Secretary Stepan Gavrilovich Kochet
 Marina Ladynina as Natasha
 Viktor Kulakov as Lt. Herman Albrecht, alias Lt. Orlov
 Mikhail Astangov as Nazi Col. Makenau
 Boris Poslavsky as Semyen Abramovich Rotman
 Mikhail Kuznetsov as Sasha Rusov
 Mikhail Zharov as Gavril Fedorovich Rusov
 Tatyana Govorkova as The Hostess (uncredited)
 Yevgeni Grigorev as Vasiliy Glushchenko (uncredited)
 Leonid Kulakov as German (uncredited)
 Sofya Levitina as Lady at the identity parade (uncredited)

References

External links 
 

1942 films
1940s war drama films
1940s Russian-language films
Soviet black-and-white films
Soviet war drama films
Eastern Front of World War II films
Films directed by Ivan Pyryev
1942 drama films